Kōwa (弘和) was a Japanese era name (年号, nengō, lit. year name) of the Southern Court during the Era of Northern and Southern Courts after Tenju and before Genchū. This period spanned the years from February 1381 to April 1384.

Nanboku-chō overview
   
During the Meiji period, an Imperial decree dated March 3, 1911 established that the legitimate reigning monarchs of this period were the direct descendants of Emperor Go-Daigo through Emperor Go-Murakami, whose  had been established in exile in Yoshino, near Nara.

Until the end of the Edo period, the militarily superior pretender-Emperors supported by the Ashikaga shogunate had been mistakenly incorporated in Imperial chronologies despite the undisputed fact that the Imperial Regalia were not in their possession.

This illegitimate  had been established in Kyoto by Ashikaga Takauji.

Change of era
 1381, also called : The new era name was created to mark an event or series of events. The previous era ended and the new one commenced in Tenju 7.

In this time frame, Eitoku (1381–1384) was the Southern Court equivalent nengō.

Events of the Kōwa Era
 1381 (Kōwa 1): The emperor travels in procession to see Ashikaga Yoshimitsu at his palacial home in Muromachi.
 1381 (Kōwa 1): the kampaku Nijō Yoshimoto is elevated to the position of daijō daijin. Yoshimitsu is raised to the Imperial court position of nadaijin at the young age of 24. Yoshimoto and Yoshimitsu work well in harmony together.
 1382 (Kōwa 2): Yoshimitsu is raised to the court position of sadaijin, and several days later, he was named General of the Left (sadaisho). In this same period, Fujiwara no Sanetoki is elevated from the position of dainagon to nadaijin.
 1383 (Kōwa 3): Emperor Go-Kameyama ascends southern throne.

Notes

References
 Ackroyd, Joyce. (1982) Lessons from History: The Tokushi Yoron. Brisbane: University of Queensland Press. 
 Mehl, Margaret. (1997). History and the State in Nineteenth-Century Japan. New York: St Martin's Press. ; OCLC 419870136
 Nussbaum, Louis Frédéric and Käthe Roth. (2005). Japan Encyclopedia. Cambridge: Harvard University Press. ; OCLC 48943301
 Thomas, Julia Adeney. (2001). Reconfiguring Modernity: Concepts of Nature in Japanese Political Ideology. Berkeley: University of California Press. ; 
 Titsingh, Isaac. (1834). Nihon Odai Ichiran; ou,  Annales des empereurs du Japon.  Paris: Royal Asiatic Society, Oriental Translation Fund of Great Britain and Ireland. OCLC 5850691

Japanese eras
1380s in Japan